Sapna Awasthi Singh is a Bollywood playback singer best remembered for her "Chaiyya Chaiyya" from Dil Se.. and "UP Bihar Lootne" from Shool (1999).

Early life and career
Sapna Awasthi started training in classical music at a young age and completed Sangeet Vishaarad in Bhatkhande Music Institute, Lucknow. She began singing for the radio when she was fifteen, before performing on stage. She received her first break in Bollywood from composer Sameer Sen.

Awasthi is from Kumaon region of Uttarakhand and relocated to Mumbai after singing songs in Krantiveer (1994). She has sung for prominent musicians like Nadeem–Shravan, Anand–Milind, Anu Malik, A. R. Rahman, Sandeep Chowta and others. Her biggest hit to date, as is usually believed, is not her duet 'Chaiyya Chaiyya' (co-singer Sukhvinder Singh) for A. R. Rahman's Dil Se (1998), but 'Pardesi Pardesi' (co-singers Udit Narayan and Alka Yagnik) for Nadeem-Shravan's Raja Hindustani (1996).

Popular songs
"Pratighat Ki Jwala" - Anjaam 1994
"Banno Teri Ankhiyan Soorme" — Dushmani: A Violent Love Story (1995)
"Pardesi Pardesi" — Raja Hindustani (1996)
"UP Bihar Lootne" — Shool (1999)
"Shadi Karvado" — Jis Desh Mein Ganga Rehta Hai (2000)
"Bachke Tu Rehna Re" — Company (2002)
"Kabhi Bandhan Chhuda Liya" — Hum Tumhare Hain Sanam (2002)
"Chaiyya Chaiyya" — Dil Se.. (1998)
"Sab Kuch Bhula Diya" — Hum Tumhare Hain Sanam (2002)
"Saajan Saajan" - Dil Ka Rishta (2003)
"Daroga Babu Re Dil Humra--30 Days,Lyrics -Sahil Sultanpiri.(2003)
"Kata Kata" — Raavan (2010)
"Katiya Karoon" — Rockstar (2011)
"Sasure Ke Kaudy Lag Gaye" - Miss Tanakpur Haazir Ho
"Jo beech bajariya tune" (ansh (2002)"

Accolades

References

Indian women playback singers
Singers from Mumbai
Year of birth missing (living people)
Living people
20th-century Indian women singers
20th-century Indian singers
Women musicians from Maharashtra